Robert Patterson (1863–1931) was an Irish naturalist. He was the son of Richard Patterson, the grandson of Robert Patterson FRS and the nephew of Robert Lloyd Patterson (1836-1906).

Robert Patterson was interested in every branch of natural history but mainly birds. He was a member of the Belfast Natural History and Philosophical Society and the Belfast Naturalists' Field Club and a founder of the Ulster Fisheries and Marine Biology Association. He also founded the People's Palace, or Patterson Museum, in Belfast which opened in 1904. This was a natural history (mainly birds) and archaeological museum intended for the free instruction of the people.

References
 Welch, R.J.et al. 1905 A new Irish museum: The Patterson Museum, People's Palace, Belfast. Irish Naturalist 14: 73-78
Welch, R.J, 1932  Obituary. Robert Patterson, 1863-1931. With portrait. The Irish naturalists' journal, Vol. IV, No. 1, pp. 19–20, January 1932

Irish zoologists
1863 births
1931 deaths